Török (Hungarian for "Turk") may refer to:
András Török (born 1978), Hungarian squash player
Bálint Török de Enying (1502–1551), Hungarian aristocrat, Ban of Nándorfehérvár (Belgrade) and Lord of Csesznek
Béla Török (born 1990), Hungarian water polo player
Bódog Török (1923–2012), Hungarian handball player, coach and sports official
Ferenc Török (born 1935), Hungarian modern pentathlete and Olympic champion
Ferenc Török (director) (born 1971), Hungarian film director
Gábor Török (footballer) (1936–2004), Hungarian football goalkeeper
Gábor Török (political scientist) (born 1971), Hungarian political scientist and historian
Gavrila Törok (born 1919), Romanian water polo player
Győző Török (1935–1987), Hungarian cyclist
Gyula Török (1938–2014), former boxer from Hungary
Ignác Török (1795–1849), Hungarian general
Jaroslav Török (born 1971), Slovak ice hockey player
László Török (1941–2020), Hungarian historian
Mária Török (born 1925–1998), Hungarian born French psychoanalyst
Mitchell Torok (born 1929–2017), American country musician of Hungarian origin
Ottó Török (born 1937), Hungarian modern pentathlete
Péter Török (1951–1987), Hungarian football Defender
Péter Török (biologist) (born 1979), Hungarian biologist and researcher
Sándor Török (1881–1939), Hungarian sports shooter
Tomáš Török (born 1995), Slovak ice hockey player
Zoltán Török (1899–1970), Hungarian rower

Hungarian-language surnames
Hungarian people of Turkish descent
Ethnonymic surnames